Austria made its Paralympic Games début at the inaugural Paralympic Games in Rome in 1960, and has participated in every edition of both the Summer and Winter Paralympics. Austria was also the host of the 1984 and 1988 Winter Paralympics, both held in Innsbruck.

Austria's largest medal haul at the Summer Games came in 1976, with a total of 50. Its lowest came in 2008, with just six medals overall - the first time ever it had failed to obtain ten medals. At the Winter Games, Austria topped the medal table when it hosted the Games in 1984, with 70 medals; its lowest total was in 2018, with 7,and for the first time in history the country did not get a gold medal.

Medals

Summer Paralympics

Winter Paralympics

Medals by Summer Sport 
Source:

Medals by Winter Sport 
Source:

See also
 Austria at the Olympics

References